Silke Hörner (born 12 September 1965) is a German former breaststroke swimmer, a leading member of the 1980s East German swimming team. She won two Olympic gold medals, in the 200 m breaststroke and 4×100 m medley relay at the 1988 Summer Olympics in Seoul, and set four individual world records. She was named by Swimming World Magazine as European Swimmer of the Year in 1985 and 1987, but her achievements are regarded with suspicion due to the state-run systematic doping program run by East Germany. In 1991, former East German swimming coach Michael Regner claimed that in the 1980s he had been instructed to distribute anabolic steroids to team swimmers, including Hörner.

Hörner came to prominence when she set a world record in the 200 m breaststroke of 2:28.33 at Leipzig in qualifying for the East German team for the 1985 European Championships. There she stumbled, swimming outside her best to place third in the 200 m event. She also claimed silver behind teammate Sylvia Gerasch in the 100 m event. Despite winning neither event, she was named as the European Swimmer of the Year.

At the 1986 World Championships in Madrid, Hörner, set a world record in the 200 m breaststroke on her way to gold, reclaiming the record from Gerasch who had broken it earlier in the year.

At the 1987 European Championships in Strasbourg, France, Hörner won both breaststroke events, claiming the 100 m breaststroke record from Gerasch in the process and  also a gold medal in the 4×100 m medley relay, resulting in her second European Swimmer of the Year award.

At the 1988 Summer Olympics in Seoul, Hörner, set a world record in the 200 m breaststroke on her way to gold, reclaiming the record from Allison Higson of Canada who had broken it earlier in the year. She was well outside her world record in the 100 m breaststroke, finishing with the bronze medal. She later combined with Kristin Otto, Birte Weigang and Katrin Meissner to win gold in the 4×100 m medley relay.

She is married to sprint canoer Alexander Schuck.

Awards and honours
 1988 Patriotic Order of Merit in Gold

References

External links

1965 births
Living people
Swimmers from Leipzig
East German female breaststroke swimmers
East German female swimmers
Olympic swimmers of East Germany
Olympic gold medalists for East Germany
Olympic bronze medalists for East Germany
Swimmers at the 1988 Summer Olympics
World record setters in swimming
Olympic bronze medalists in swimming
World Aquatics Championships medalists in swimming
European Aquatics Championships medalists in swimming
Medalists at the 1988 Summer Olympics
Olympic gold medalists in swimming
Recipients of the Patriotic Order of Merit in gold
Sportspeople from Leipzig